Kalliopi A. Kehagia (Καλλιόπη Κεχαγιά) (18391905), was a Greek feminist and educator. Head of the Hill School for girls in Athens and the Zappeion School for Girls in Istanbul, she also founded the Society for Promoting Women's Education.

Biography
Kehajia was born in Greece in 1839. She travelled to London to gain an education as a teacher before returning to Greece. She became the Head of the Hill school for girls in Athens where she gave the first open lectures on Literature and social issues including women's issues. 

She founded the Society for Promoting Women's Education in 1872. She visited France in 1874 to examine their educational systems and to network with other women and educators. And in 1875 she moved to Istanbul to found the Zappeion School for Girls. She ran the school as its Head for fifteen years. Kehajia also travelled to the United States and used the experience to publish newspaper articles describing the status of women in Greece. Kehajia died in 1905.

Sources

1839 births
1905 deaths
19th-century women educators
19th-century Greek women
Greek feminists
People from Bursa
People from Athens